Chana is an unincorporated community in Ogle County, Illinois, United States, and is located southeast of Oregon.

Notable person
Robert R. Canfield (1909-1994), lawyer and politician, was born in Chana.

See also

References

External links

Unincorporated communities in Ogle County, Illinois
Unincorporated communities in Illinois
Populated places established in 1871
1871 establishments in Illinois